Sophronica angusticollis is a species of beetle in the family Cerambycidae. It was described by Per Olof Christopher Aurivillius in 1928. It is known from Somalia, Ethiopia, Tanzania, and Kenya.

Subspecies
 Sophronica angusticollis angusticollis Aurivillius, 1928
 Sophronica angusticollis boreana Müller, 1939

References

Sophronica
Beetles described in 1928